Nils Bo Anders König (born 31 May 1965) is a Swedish speed skater. He competed in three events at the 1992 Winter Olympics.

References

External links
 

1965 births
Living people
Swedish male speed skaters
Olympic speed skaters of Sweden
Speed skaters at the 1992 Winter Olympics
People from Askersund Municipality
Sportspeople from Örebro County
20th-century Swedish people